Excalibur is an album by American guitarist and singer Tom Fogerty. His second solo effort, it was released in 1972. The album features Jerry Garcia on guitar, Merl Saunders on keyboards, John Kahn on bass, and Bill Vitt on drums (Jerry and the band were all signed on the same label, Fantasy Records, for the albums Live at Keystone and its follow-ups).

Track listing 
All songs written by Tom Fogerty, except where noted.

 "Forty Years" – 3:40
 "Black Jack Jenny" – 2:30
 "Rocky Road Blues" – 3:56 (Bill Monroe)
 "Faces, Places, People" – 3:55
 "Get Funky" – 1:54
 "Sick and Tired" – 4:20 (Chris Kenner, Dave Bartholomew)
 "Sign of the Devil" – 2:37
 "Straight and Narrow" – 3:48
 "Next in Line" – 2:16
 "(Hold On) Annie Mae" – 3:49

Personnel 

 Tom Fogerty – guitar, harmonica, vocals
 Jerry Garcia – guitar
 Merl Saunders – keyboards
 John Kahn – bass
 Bill Vitt – drums

References 

1972 albums
Tom Fogerty albums
Fantasy Records albums